Marquis Jules Félix Philippe Albert de Dion de Wandonne (9 March 185619 August 1946) was a French pioneer of the automobile industry. He invented a steam-powered car and used it to win the world's first auto race, but his vehicle was adjudged to be against the rules. He was a co-founder of De Dion-Bouton, the world's largest automobile manufacturer for a time, as well as the French sports newspaper L'Équipe.

His life
Dion was the heir of a leading French noble family, in 1901 succeeding his father Louis Albert William Joseph de Dion de Wandonne as Count and later Marquis. A "notorious duellist", he also had a passion for mechanics. He had already built a model steam engine when, in 1881, he saw one in a store window and asked about building another. The engineers, Georges Bouton and his brother-in-law, Charles Trépardoux, had a shop in Léon where they made scientific toys. Needing money for Trépardoux's long-time dream of a steam car, they acceded to De Dion's request.

During 1883, they formed a partnership which became the De Dion-Bouton automobile company, the world's largest automobile manufacturer for a time. They tried marine steam engines, but progressed to a steam car which used belts to drive the front wheels whilst steering with the rear. This was destroyed by fire during trials. In 1884, they built another, "La Marquise", with steerable front wheels and drive to the rear wheels.

Comte de Dion entered one in an 1887 trial, "Europe's first motoring competition", the brainchild of M. Paul Faussier of cycling magazine Le Vélocipède Illustré. Evidently, the promotion was insufficient, for the de Dion was the sole entrant, but it completed the course.

The de Dion tube (or 'dead axle') was actually invented by steam advocate Trépardoux, just before he resigned because the company was turning to internal combustion.

In 1898, he co-founded the Mondial de l'Automobile (Paris Motor Show). 

He died in 1946, age 90, and is buried in the cemetery at Montparnasse in Paris.

Racing career
Motor racing was started in France as a direct result of the enthusiasm with which the French public embraced the motor car. Manufacturers were enthusiastic due to the possibility of using motor racing as a shop window for their cars. The first motor race took place on 22 July 1894 and was organised by Le Petit Journal, a Parisian newspaper. It was run over the  distance between Paris and Rouen. The race was won by de Dion, although he was not awarded the prize for first place as his steam-powered car required a stoker and the judges deemed this outside of their objectives.

Dreyfus affair and L'Auto
The roots of both the Tour de France cycle race and L'Auto (L'Équipe), a daily sporting newspaper, can be traced to the Dreyfus affair and de Dion's passionate anti-dreyfusard opinion and actions.

Opinions were heated and there were demonstrations by both sides in the Dreyfus affair. Historian Eugen Weber described an 1899 conflagration at the Auteuil horse-race course in Paris as "an absurd political shindig" when, among other events, the President of France (Émile Loubet) was struck on the head by a walking stick wielded by de Dion. He served 15 days in jail and was fined 100 francs, and his behaviour was heavily criticised by Le Vélo, the largest daily sports newspaper in France, and its Dreyfusard editor, Pierre Giffard. 

As a result, de Dion withdrew all his advertising from the paper, and in 1900, he led a group of wealthy 'anti-Dreyfusard' manufacturers, including Édouard Michelin and Adolphe Clément, to start a rival daily sports paper, L'Auto-Velo, and compete directly with Le Velo. De Dion and Michelin were also concerned with Le Vélo – which reported more than cycling – because its financial backer was one of their commercial rivals, the Darracq company. De Dion believed that Le Vélo gave Darracq too much attention and him too little. After a legally enforced change of name to L'Auto, it in turn created the Tour de France race in 1903 to boost falling circulation.

De Dion was an outspoken man who already wrote columns for Le Figaro, Le Matin and others. His wealth allowed him to indulge his whims, which also included refounding Le Nain jaune (The Yellow Gnome), a fortnightly publication which "answers no particular need."

Notes

References

 Georgano, G. N. Cars: Early and Vintage, 1886–1930. London: Grange-Universal, 1990 (reprints AB Nordbok 1985 edition).
 Wise, David Burgess, "De Dion: The Aristocrat and the Toymaker", in Ward, Ian, executive editor. The World of Automobiles, Volume 5 (London: Orbis Publishing, 1974), pp. 510–514.
 Profile on Historic Racing

External links 
 

1856 births
1946 deaths
French automotive pioneers
French founders of automobile manufacturers
French marquesses
French Senators of the Third Republic
Members of the Ligue de la patrie française
People from Loire-Atlantique
Senators of Loire-Atlantique
Antidreyfusards